Constantine Phokas (died 953/954) was a Byzantine aristocrat and general.

Life
Constantine was the youngest son of Bardas Phokas the Elder, and brother of the general and later emperor Nikephoros II Phokas and the general Leo Phokas the Younger. When his father was appointed as Domestic of the Schools (commander-in-chief of the Byzantine army) in 945, Constantine was appointed  (military governor) of the theme of Seleucia, on the Empire's southeastern border with the Muslim world.

He participated in his father's campaigns against the Muslims, and was captured by the Hamdanid Emir of Aleppo, Sayf al-Dawla, at the Battle of Marash in 953. Constantine took part in Sayf al-Dawla's subsequent triumphal entry into Aleppo, but he soon fell ill and died (probably in early 954). Some Byzantine sources suggest that he was poisoned by Sayf al-Dawla after refusing to convert to Islam, while Arab sources claim that he was poisoned by Byzantine agents after Sayf al-Dawla refused a huge ransom offered by Bardas Phokas. Whatever the truth, Constantine's death seems to have been blamed on Sayf al-Dawla by the Byzantines, and many Arab captives, including some of the Hamdanid emir's relatives, were executed as a result. Some Byzantine and Arab sources claim that this resulted in the failure of a peace embassy sent by the Byzantines in June 954 under Paul Monomachos, but modern scholars discount this.

References

Sources
 
 
 

950s deaths
10th-century Byzantine military personnel
Byzantine generals
Byzantine governors
Constantine
Byzantine people of the Arab–Byzantine wars
Byzantine prisoners of war
Year of birth unknown